Purano Dunga (English: Old Boat) is a 2016 Nepali slice of life film directed by Ram Babu Gurung and produced by Raunak Bikram Kandel, Prakash Gurung, Om Chand Rauniyar and Dhan Bahadur Gurung  in association with Cinema Arts. The film stars Dayahang Rai, and Priyanka Karki in the lead roles as a couple, with Maotse Gurung and Menuka Pradhan in the supporting role as brother and sister in law.

Plot 
Purano Dunga tells the story of two Bhujel brothers - Bhakta Bahadur, the older brother played by Maotse Gurung, makes his living by rowing his boat across Lake Begnas, while Batase, played by Dayahang Rai,idles his life away in the city. One day, Batase asks for his share of the family fortune wherein he asks for the boat. The story unfolds as Bhakta is forced to give up the boat to his brother and starts to struggle financially as the boat was his only livelihood. One day, a local villager buys a boat because Batase took away the village's only boat. This angers Bhakta and he destroys the boat, and then buys an old leaky boat from the money he had saved, but, before he can repair it, the owner of the destroyed boat calls the police and they arrive and arrest him. As they leave, his wife Manu sees her husband taken away and decides to follow him on the leaky old boat despite him telling her not to. Suddenly, the boat starts sinking and she jumps into the lake; seeing this, Bhakta jumps in as well to save her but as they reach the shore his wife dies. The film closes as Batase watches his brother Bhakta as he leaves his home with his baby on his back.

Cast 
 Dayahang Rai as Batashe
 Priyanka Karki as Chandra
 Maotse Gurung as Bhakta Bahadur Bhujel 
 Menuka Pradhan as Manamaya/ Manu
 Sudam Ck as Dohori Sau
 Purnima Gurung
 Maniram Pokhrel
 Buddhi Tamang as Bideshi

Soundtrack

Awards

References

External links 

 

2016 films
2010s Nepali-language films
Films shot in Kathmandu
Nepalese comedy-drama films
Films shot in Pokhara